Presian was the khan of Bulgaria in 836–852. He ruled during an extensive expansion in Macedonia.

Origin
The composite picture of the Byzantine sources indicates that Presian I was the son of Zvinitsa (Zbēnitzēs), who was a son of Omurtag. In several older studies Presian is identified with his short-lived predecessor Malamir and it is assumed that this single character survived until the 850s as the direct predecessor of Boris I. This is very unlikely, as Malamir is attested as having been succeeded by his nephew (the son of his brother Zvinitsa), while Boris I was preceded by his father Presian. Zlatarski resolved the problems in the fragmentary sources by determining that Malamir's unnamed nephew and successor was in fact Presian, and Boris I was the latter's son.

The 17th century Volga Bulgar compilation Cäğfär Taríxı, a work of disputed authenticity, represents Birdžihan (i.e., Presian) as the son of Sabanša (i.e., Zvinitsa), which may lend support to the interpretation of his origins now dominant in Bulgarian historiography.

Conflict with Serbia and Byzantium 

Presian may have been young and inexperienced at the time of his accession, and state affairs may have been dominated by the minister (Kavkhan) Isbul, as under Presian's uncle Malamir. In 837, soon after Presian's accession, the Slavs in the vicinity of Thessalonica rebelled against the Byzantine Empire.  Emperor Theophilos sought Bulgarian support in putting down the rebellion, but simultaneously arranged for his fleet to sail through the Danube delta and undertake a clandestine evacuation of some of the Byzantine captives settled in trans-Danubian Bulgaria by Krum and Omurtag.

In retaliation Isbul campaigned along the Aegean coasts of Thrace and Macedonia and captured the city of Philippi, where he set up a surviving memorial inscription set up in a local church.  Isbul's campaign may have resulted in the establishment of Bulgarian suzerainty over the Slavic tribe of the Smolyani.

Presian's reign coincides with the extension of Bulgarian control over the Slavic tribes in and around Macedonia.  It is known that the Serbs and Bulgars lived in peace until Presian invaded Serbian territory in 839, during the last years of Theophilos. Vlastimir, the Knez of Serbia, united several Serbian tribes, and Emperor Theophilos (r. 829–842) granted the Serbs independence; thus, the Serbs acknowledged the nominal overlordship of the Emperor. The annexation of western Macedonia by the Bulgars changed the political situation. Malamir or Presian may have seen a threat in the Serb consolidation, and opted to subjugate them in the midst of the conquest of Slav lands. Another reason might have been that the Byzantines wanted to divert attention in order to cope with the Slav Uprising in the Peloponnese, and so sent the Serbs to instigate the war.  Presian invaded Serbian territory in 839. The invasion led to a 3-year war, in which Vlastimir was victorious; Presian was driven out of Serbian territory by Vlastimir's army. In addition to making no territorial gains, Presian suffered heavy losses due to the Serbian tactical advantage in the hills.  The war ended with the death of Theophilos in 842, which released Vlastimir from his obligations to the Byzantine Empire.

Presian died in 852, and was succeeded by his son Boris I.

Honour
Presian Ridge on Livingston Island in the South Shetland Islands, Antarctica, is named after Presian I of Bulgaria.

See also
Bulgars
History of Bulgaria
Presian Inscription

References

Sources
 Jordan Andreev, Ivan Lazarov, Plamen Pavlov, Koj koj e v srednovekovna Bălgarija, Sofia 1999.
 Vasil Zlatarski, Istorija na bălgarskata dăržava, 1:1, Sofia, 1918.
 (primary source), Bahši Iman, Džagfar Tarihy, vol. III, Orenburg 1997.
De Administrando Imperio by Constantine Porphyrogenitus, edited by Gy. Moravcsik and translated by R. J. H. Jenkins, Dumbarton Oaks Center for Byzantine Studies, Washington D. C., 1993
 
 
 
 

852 deaths
9th-century Bulgarian monarchs
Year of birth unknown
Bulgarian people of the Byzantine–Bulgarian Wars
People of the Bulgarian–Serbian Wars
Krum's dynasty